Gwent County Council was the upper-tier local authority that governed the county of Gwent in South Wales from its creation in 1974 to its abolition in 1996. For most of its existence, the county council was based in Cwmbran.

History
Gwent County Council was created on 1 April 1974 under the Local Government Act 1972. It took over the geographical area and main roles of the previous councils, Monmouthshire County Council (1889–1974) and Newport County Borough Council (1891–1974), subject to some boundary changes along the western border. Five district councils provided a second tier of government, namely Blaenau Gwent, Islwyn, Monmouth, Newport and Torfaen.

Political control
The first election to the county council was held on 12 April 1973, initially operating as a shadow authority alongside the outgoing authorities until it came into its powers on 1 April 1974. Political control of the council from 1974 until its abolition in 1996 was held by the following parties:

The first Chief Executive of Gwent County Council was James Bray, who had previously been deputy clerk of Monmouthshire County Council. The Chairman of Gwent County Council from 1974 was 78-year-old Councillor Barney O'Neill, who had previously been a representative on Monmouthshire County Council and Chepstow Urban District Council.

Elections
At the first election in 1973, 78 councillors were elected from 66 electoral divisions. The number of councillors was reduced to 63 in 1989.

Premises
The council was initially based at the old Monmouthshire County Council's headquarters at Shire Hall in Newport, while a new headquarters was being built in Cwmbran. The new County Hall was on Turnpike Road in Croesyceiliog, on the eastern outskirts of Cwmbran, and was completed in 1977.

References

Gwent (county)
County councils of Wales
1974 establishments in Wales
1996 disestablishments in Wales